Ballygunge Assembly constituency is a Legislative Assembly constituency of Kolkata district in the Indian state of West Bengal.

Overview
As per orders of the Delimitation Commission, No. 161 Ballygunge Assembly constituency is composed of the following: Ward Nos. 60, 61, 64, 65, 68, 69 and 85 of Kolkata municipal corporation.

Ballygunge Assembly constituency is part of No. 23 Kolkata Dakshin (Lok Sabha constituency).

Members of Legislative Assembly

^ by-poll

Election results

2022 by-poll

2021

2016

2011

References

Assembly constituencies of West Bengal
Politics of Kolkata district
1952 establishments in West Bengal
Constituencies established in 1952